Tony Buon (born December 1960), is a British workplace psychologist, speaker, mediator and author. He is the Managing Partner of Buon Consultancy based in Edinburgh, Scotland

Buon has been a Lecturer at Robert Gordon University in Aberdeen Scotland, a Senior lecturer at Macquarie University Australia and at the University of Western Sydney, Australia and a Visiting professor at a number of international universities including Harvard (USA), Shanghai Normal University (PRC) and Trinity College Dublin. His areas of expertise include: Workplace psychology; learning & development, alcohol & other drugs in the workplace; employee assistance programs; workplace mediation; cultural communication, EAPs, recruitment and credentialism

Education 
Tony Buon holds diplomas in Mediation, Conflict Resolution, Counseling and Teaching. He has also been awarded degrees in Psychology and Behavioural Sciences and he holds Post-Graduate Qualifications in Education and Organisational Psychology. His post-graduate research was into recruitment and credentialism was conducted at Macquarie University in Australia.

Work 
Buon has taught leadership, psychology and human resources management up to Master’s Level in universities in Australia and the UK and has also taught an accredited MBA programme. Today he provides consultancy and training services on learning and development, HRM, workplace mediation and other people issues. Tony Buon has worked in a number of countries including the UK, Ireland, Australia, China, Malaysia, USA, Finland, Greece, GCC, Nigeria, France and Italy.

Born in Scotland, Tony spent many years in Australia where he owned and ran a large workplace psychological services consultancy. He also opened the first private psychological services in the People’s Republic of China. In 2008 he ran training programmes in China for Psychologists providing trauma counselling to the survivors of the Wenchuan earthquake.

Books 
Buon has written a number of books and book chapters on subjects related to psychology, communication, coaching and counseling. His best selling book was "The Leadership Coach"  part of the well known "Teach Yourself" series and published by Hodder & Stoughton. His book "Communication Genius: 40 Insights From the Science of Communicating" was published by John Murray John Murray (publishing house) in 2015 in the UK and in 2016 in the USA

Media appearances 
Buon has been featured in Rolling Stone magazine and The Reader's Digest. He has appeared on CNN, BBC, Trans-World Sport and many international television and radio stations discussing people problems, and workplace psychology.

Film production 
Buon has produced a number of specialist training and educational films, including the Human Rights Australia Award nominated film In Too Deep.

Selected bibliography 
 Buon, T (2015) Communication Genius: 40 Insights from the Science of Communicating. Hodder & Stoughton General Division  
 Buon, T & Kinder, A (2015) The Role of Coaching in Supporting Organisations to Address mental Health Issues". Ch.9. in Coaching in Times of Crisis and Transformation: How to Help Individuals and Organizations Flourish. Liz Hall (Ed). Kogan Page 
 Buon, T (2014) The Leadership Coach. Hodder & Stoughton: London 
 Buon, T (2012) Counselling & Psychology in China. Counselling at Work. Autumn.
 Zhu, X, Wang, Z, and Buon, T (2012). Trauma Counseling and Psychological Support in the People's Republic of China (PRC). in International Handbook of Workplace Trauma Support'', 1st Edition. Edited by R. Hughes, C. Cooper, and A. Kinder. John Wiley: UK  
 Buon, T & Taylor, J (2008) A Review of the EAP Market in the United Kingdom and Europe.  Journal of Workplace Behavioral Health, Vol. 23(4) 425-443 
 Buon, T (2008) Perspectives on Managing Workplace Conflict. In Employee Well-being Support: A Workplace Resource (2008) Kinder, A, Hughes, R & Cooper Cary (Eds), John Wiley & Sons, Ltd Publisher  
 Buon T & Buon, C (2007) The Bully Within. Counselling at Work. Summer.
 Buon, T (2005). The Management of Workplace Bullying. PKU Business Review, 5, 74-79, Peking University (PRC) (Published in Chinese).
 Buon, T (2005). Employee Counselling and Performance Management, Counselling at Work. Summer, 18-19.
 Buon, T (2004). Future of workplace counselling. Counselling at Work. ACW. Summer 
 Buon, T (2003). Not another Syndicate Group! Development and Learning in Organizations: An International Journal. 18, 1, 15-17. 
 Buon, Y. and Compton, B. 1994. The Development of Alcohol and Other Drug Programs in the Workplace. In Stone, R. J. (Ed.). Readings in Human Resource Management (Volume 2): 240–252. Brisbane: John Wiley Ltd.  
 Buon, T (1994). The Recruitment of Training Professionals. Training & Development in Australia, 21, 17-22.
 Buon, T & Compton, B (1989). Who's on the qualifications merry-go-round?  
 Buon, T. (1984). The Newtown Project - A Programme Intended to Reduce Juvenile Shop Stealing Behaviour.  Proceedings of the Institute of Criminology, 57, 84-87.

References

External links 
 

Living people
1960 births
British business theorists